Eduardo "Edu" Cortina García (born 25 September 1996) is a Spanish footballer who plays for Mérida AD as a midfielder.

Club career
Born in Oviedo, Asturias, Cortina finished his formation with Real Oviedo. He made his senior debut with the reserves during the 2015–16 campaign, in Tercera División.

Cortina made his professional debut on 11 September 2018, coming on as a first-half substitute for injured Sergio Tejera in a 0–1 away loss against RCD Mallorca for the season's Copa del Rey. Five days later he made his Segunda División debut, replacing Javi Muñoz in a 2–0 away win against CD Lugo.

On 11 June 2019, Cortina was one of the seven players from the B-side who were promoted to the main squad for the 2019–20 campaign. On 28 September of the following year, after featuring rarely, he terminated his contract, and signed for Segunda División B side Mérida AD just hours later.

References

External links

1996 births
Living people
People from Oviedo
Spanish footballers
Footballers from Asturias
Association football midfielders
Segunda División players
Segunda División B players
Tercera División players
Real Oviedo Vetusta players
Real Oviedo players
Mérida AD players